Bolera (International title: Break Shot / ) is a 2022 Philippine television drama sports series broadcast by GMA Network. Directed by Dominic Zapata, it stars Kylie Padilla in the title role. It premiered on May 30, 2022, on the network's Telebabad line up replacing False Positive. The series concluded on August 26, 2022, with a total of 65 episodes. It was replaced by What We Could Be in its timeslot.

Cast and characters

Lead cast
 Kylie Padilla as Jose Maria "Joni/Bolera" Fajardo Jr.

Supporting cast
 Rayver Cruz as Miguel Salvador / El Salvador
 Jak Roberto as Pepito "Toypits" Canlas
 Jaclyn Jose as Tessa Carillo-Fajardo
 Gardo Versoza as Marco "Cobrador" Alcantara
 Joey Marquez as Freddie "Scorpion" Roldan
 David Remo as Jose Maria "Tres" Fajardo III
 Via Veloso as Marla Toledo-Roldan
 Ge Villamil as Marika "Kikay" Carillo
 Luri Vincent Nalus as Pogi

Guest cast
 Al Tantay as Jose Maria "Joma/JoMaster" Fajardo Sr.
 Klea Pineda as Sheena "Golden Eye" Kim
 Ina Raymundo as Floriza "White Lotus" Andal
 Julia Lee as Laura Cruz-Salvador
 Sue Prado as P/CMS Romana "Roma" Canlas
 Mico Aytona as Felix "Magicman of Cebu" delos Reyes
 Elle Ramirez as Macy "Amazing Macy" delos Reyes
 Andrew Gan as Datu "Bulls Eye" Gidapawan
 Mhyca Bautista as Cynthia "Strong Heart" Mapag
 Mel Caluag as Tina
 Josh Bulot as Benjo
 Jeremy Sabido as Caloy
 Efren "Bata" Reyes as himself

Production
Principal photography ended on April 27, 2022.

Episodes
<onlyinclude>

References

External links
 
 

2022 Philippine television series debuts
2022 Philippine television series endings
Cue sports in the Philippines
Cue sports on television
Filipino-language television shows
GMA Network drama series
Philippine sports television series
Television shows set in the Philippines
Women in cue sports